St. Mary's is a Grade II parish church situated in the village of Walton on the Wolds in Leicestershire.

Description

Current benefice 
St Mary's is connected to the parish of Barrow on Soar. and is part of a wider group of churches described as the Barrow and Wolds Group. The church falls within the Loughborough Archdeaconry, and Akeley East Deanery. The legal name of the parish is Barrow upon Soar with Walton le Wolds.

The Barrow & Wolds Group also includes:

 Holy Trinity Church, Barrow upon Soar
 St Mary's Church, Wymeswold
St Andrew's Church, Prestwold

Services 
The church holds occasional services. Check website for details. 
AM

Heritage 
A church, dedicated to St Bartholomew, is believed to have been present in the village since at least 1220, however the church was rebuilt in 1736 and dedicated to St Mary. The current west tower has been dated back to this 18th century rebuild. The church experienced further rebuilding in the 19th century, including the nave and chancel, which had a Gothic influence. The church has been noted for its unusual use of red brick since rubblestone is more commonly used among churches in the locality. The heritage listing notes that the church has several stained glass windows.

References

See also

Grade II listed churches in Leicestershire